Yevheniia Markiianivna Kucherenko (27 December 1922 – 29 December 2020) was a Soviet Ukrainian pedagogue of the Ukrainian language and literature at the No. 74 Lviv Secondary Comprehensive School in the village of Rudne for 49 years until her retirement in 1996. She had more than 70 of her works published in methodological journals in the Ukrainian educational press.

Biography
She left Zakin Nemiriv Pedagogical Technical School in 1939, and graduated from Vinnytsia State Pedagogical University in 1946. 

Following her graduation from university, Kucherenko was sent to work in the Lviv Oblast. She worked as a teacher of the Ukrainian language and literature at the No. 74 Lviv Secondary Comprehensive School in the village of Rudne for the following 49 years until she retired from work in 1996. Kucherenko was one of the first educators in the Lviv Oblast to employ technical teaching aids such as tape records, grammophone records, film stills and transparencies. Kucherenko earned her  with a dissertation on 27 December 1972.

From 1959, more than 70 of Kucherenko's works were published in methodological journals in the Ukrainian educational press. She published Movie development at literature lessons in the fifth grade (Speech development at literature lessons in grade 5" (1965) in 1965 and Movie development at literature lessons in grades 4–5 (Speech development at literature lessons in grades 4 -5 grades 11 years later. She collaborated with the Instytut pedahohiky employee Oleksandra Bandura to publish the textbook Ukrainian Literature, 5th grade in 1969. Throughout the 1990s, Kucherenko co-wrote Ukrainian language textbooks for students in grades 5 to 8 in the newly independent Ukraine. She authored a textbook on Ukrainian literature for schools in independent Ukraine teaching Polish and Ukrainian, with instructions.

She was elected chair of the Commission on Youth Affairs and was a member of the regional committee of a trade union. Kucherenko was resident in the city of Lviv and died on 29 December 2020.

Awards
Kucherenko and Bandura both received the State Prize of Ukraine in Science and Technology on 13 December 1977, for their work on the eighth edition of the textbook Ukrainian literature, 5th grade.

References

1922 births
2020 deaths
People from Chernihiv Oblast
Vinnytsia State Pedagogical University alumni
20th-century Ukrainian educators
20th-century Ukrainian women writers
21st-century Ukrainian women
Soviet schoolteachers
Ukrainian schoolteachers
Ukrainian women educators
Soviet women writers
Ukrainian women non-fiction writers
Communist Party of the Soviet Union members
Recipients of the Order of Lenin
Heroes of Socialist Labour
Laureates of the State Prize of Ukraine in Science and Technology